Brocket Hall is a neo-classical country house set in a large park at the western side of the urban area of Welwyn Garden City in Hertfordshire, England. The estate is equipped with two golf courses and seven smaller listed buildings, apart from the main house. The freehold on the estate is held by the 3rd Baron Brocket. The house is Grade I-listed.

History
On the parkland site were two predecessors, the first of which was built in 1239 as Watership or Durantshide Manor, early held variously of Hatfield Manor and the Bishop of Ely.
One of these was built about 1430; whereas in 1413 John Mortimer held Waterships it is known in 1477 Thomas Brockett held both manors. The house was acquired by John Brocket in the early 1550s and passed to his son Sir John Brocket (Captain of Queen Elizabeth's personal guard) on his death in 1558.

The building and park owe much of their appearance today to Sir Matthew Lamb, 1st Baronet, who purchased the estate in 1746 and commissioned Brocket Hall to the designs of the architect Sir James Paine in around 1760.

Sir Matthew Lamb's son was Peniston Lamb, 1st Viscount Melbourne, and he was often visited at Brocket Hall by the Prince Regent, who had a liaison with Lady Melbourne.

The next owner was The 2nd Viscount Melbourne, who was Queen Victoria's first Prime Minister 1835–41, when she regularly visited. His wife, Lady Caroline Lamb, infamously had an affair with Lord Byron causing Lord Melbourne much embarrassment. For one of his birthdays she held a state banquet in the Saloon, at which she had herself served from a large silver dish, naked.

On Lamb's death, the house passed to his sister, Emily, whose second husband was another Prime Minister, Lord Palmerston.

On Emily's death, the hall then passed to Emily's grandson by her first marriage, The 7th Earl Cowper, though it was his younger brother, Henry (d.1887), who lived at Brocket Hall.

In 1893, The 1st Baron Mount Stephen, President of the Bank of Montreal and the first Canadian to be elevated to the Peerage of the United Kingdom, leased Brocket Hall from the 7th Earl for the remainder of his lifetime. For the next three years guests included the Queen's children: The Prince and Princess of Wales, The Duke and Duchess of Connaught and the Princess Mary, Duchess of Teck. In 1897, one year after his first wife died in 1896, Lord Mount Stephen married Georgina Mary (known as Gian) Tufnell, the Lady-in-Waiting to Princess Mary Adelaide, Duchess of Teck, who encouraged the match. Gian was a lifelong friend and confidant of the Duchess's daughter, Mary of Teck, the wife of King George V, and the Mount Stephenses regularly entertained the Royal couple. Gian preferred life at Brocket Hall to the social life that surrounded their London residence at Carlton House Terrace. Lady Mount Stephen was a close friend of Georgina, Marchioness of Salisbury, who lived on the neighbouring estate, Hatfield House.

After the death of The 7th Earl Cowper (1905), the underlying future reversion was left to his niece, but she died only a year after him (1906) and the estate passed to her husband, Admiral Lord Walter Kerr, who lived at Melbourne Hall. When the life tenant Lord Mount Stephen died in 1921, Kerr put the estate up for sale and in 1923 it was purchased by Sir Charles Nall-Cain, who co-ran the brewing company Walker Cain Ltd; he was created Baron Brocket in 1933. His son, The 2nd Baron Brocket, was a Nazi sympathiser and, when he was interned during the Second World War, his property was sequestrated and put to use as a maternity hospital.

In 1996 the 3rd Baron Brocket (often styled as Charlie Brocket) was convicted of insurance fraud. While serving a prison sentence, he let the whole estate for a minimum of 60 years to CCA (Club Corporation of Asia) based in Hong Kong. CCA converted Brocket Hall into a hotel and conference centre, built a second eighteen-hole golf course and developed a restaurant called Auberge du Lac in an existing building on the estate.

Location
The estate almost touches the A1(M) motorway near Welwyn Garden City which is on the opposite side of the motorway; administratively and historically it lies at the extreme northern end of Hatfield.

Park and lake
In the 1770s the park was landscaped making use of the River Lea which is dammed to form a "broadwater" or lake.
Next to the weir is a neoclassical bridge, often described as Palladian, which carries an approach drive across the river: it is faced in Portland stone and was designed by Paine.

The park is listed as Grade II in the Register of Historic Parks and Gardens. The parkland is since the mid-1990s largely overlain by golf courses and is bounded by substantial woodland belts.

Paine also built the Temple with an Adam-style plaster ceiling, elliptical porch that has niches either side of a Victorian period half glazed door and a pediment above its eastern entrance, typical of the finest garden temples of the era.

Among other buildings on the estate is Brocket Lea, an early 17th-century house on the south side of the river Lea.

In popular culture
Brocket Hall has been used as a filming location for film and television productions, and for music videos, including: Night of the Demon (1957); Murder with Mirrors; Johnny English Reborn The Queen; Willow; Pride and Prejudice featuring Colin Firth. It also features in the Inspector Morse episode, "Who Killed Harry Field?" (1991); in the Agatha Christie's Poirot episode "The Labours of Hercules" (2013);  in an episode of EastEnders screened on 1 January 2017; in Holby City and in the TV series Victoria.

The hall was used in the Shakin' Stevens video "You Drive Me Crazy" in 1980 and in 1983, for Mike Oldfield's “ Moonlight Shadow”. The British pop group Steps used it as the location for their 2001 music video for "It's the Way You Make Me Feel".

References and notes
References

Notes

External links

Early history
DiCamillo companion entry

Buildings and structures in Welwyn Hatfield (district)
Country houses in Hertfordshire
Hotels in Hertfordshire
Golf clubs and courses in Hertfordshire
Grade I listed buildings in Hertfordshire
Grade I listed houses
Grade II listed parks and gardens in Hertfordshire
Neoclassical architecture in Hertfordshire
Prime ministerial homes in the United Kingdom
Lakes of Hertfordshire
Weirs on the River Lea
Country house hotels